This is a list of individuals, groups of individuals, and companies who have or had owned and operated a professional football club competing in Indian Super League. Some owners have significant interest in the club, estimated net worth and source of wealth.

Current clubs
The following is a list of current Indian Super League club owners:

Former clubs 

This list features all the former clubs that featured in the Indian Super League in the past:

See also
 List of Indian Super League records and statistics 
 List of Indian Super League seasons 
 List of foreign Indian Super League players 
 List of Indian Super League head coaches 
 Indian Super League attendance 
 List of Indian Super League hat-tricks

References

Indian Super League lists